The 1871 Dover by-election was held on 25 November 1871.  The byelection was held due to the incumbent Liberal MP, George Jessel, becoming Solicitor General for England and Wales.  It was retained by Jessel with a reduced majority  There was a riot following the result.

References

1871 elections in the United Kingdom
1871 in England
19th century in Kent
November 1871 events
History of Dover, Kent
By-elections to the Parliament of the United Kingdom in Kent constituencies
Ministerial by-elections to the Parliament of the United Kingdom